Maryland Route 607 (MD 607) is a state highway in the U.S. state of Maryland. The state highway runs  from Woods Road south of MD 100 north to MD 173 in Jacobsville. MD 607 was constructed from MD 177 to MD 173 in the mid-1930s and extended to its present southern terminus in the early 1970s.

Route description

MD 607 begins as Magothy Bridge Road at an intersection with Woods Road and Seaborne Drive near Jacobsville. Magothy Bridge Road continues south and west as a county highway toward a crossing of the Magothy River and on to Pasadena. MD 607 heads north as a two-lane undivided road and temporarily becomes a divided highway around its intersection with MD 100 (Paul T. Pitcher Memorial Highway). The state highway continues north to the center of Jacobsville, where the road meets MD 177 (Mountain Road). MD 607 continues north as Hog Neck Road to its northern terminus at MD 173 (Fort Smallwood Road).

MD 607 is a part of the National Highway System as a principal arterial from MD 100 to MD 173 in Jacobsville.

History
MD 607 was constructed from MD 177 to MD 173 in 1936. The highway was extended south to its present terminus in 1970, shortly before the completion of MD 100 from MD 2 in Pasadena to MD 177 east of Jacobsville.

Junction list

See also

References

External links

MDRoads: MD 607
Maryland Roads - MD 607

607
Maryland Route 607